Harley Edwin Rouda Jr. (born December 10, 1961) is an American attorney, businessman and politician who served as the U.S. representative for California's 48th congressional district from 2019 to 2021. He was the first Democrat to represent the district, which encompasses southwestern coastal portions of Orange County including the cities of Huntington Beach, Costa Mesa and Newport Beach.

Rouda first ran for office in the 2018 election, when he defeated 15-term Republican incumbent Dana Rohrabacher. He was defeated for reelection by Orange County Supervisor Michelle Steel in 2020. After considering running for Congress in the 2022 elections, Rouda announced he would not seek any public office that cycle. 

With incumbent representative Katie Porter announcing a run for senate, the race will be open.

Early life and education
Rouda was born December 10, 1961, in Columbus, Ohio, the son of Marlese Rouda and the late Harley Edwin Rouda.

Rouda received his Bachelor of Science from the University of Kentucky in 1984, where he was a member of Delta Tau Delta social fraternity. He also earned a Juris Doctor from Capital University Law School in 1986 and Master of Business Administration from Ohio State University in 2002.

Career 
Following passage of the Ohio bar examination, Rouda worked at the law firm of Porter Wright Morris & Arthur LLP in Columbus, Ohio until 1990. He later left the firm to join his family business, HER Realtors, and eventually served as CEO of Trident Holdings, the parent company of HER Realtors.

Early political career 
Rouda says he was raised in a "traditional Republican household." He was a registered Republican until 1997, when he left the party and became an independent because he felt the Republican Party had been moving in the "wrong direction" on social issues. Rouda says the last Republican he voted for was Bob Dole in the 1996 presidential election. He switched his party affiliation to the Democratic Party after the 2016 election. Shortly before registering as a Democrat, Rouda donated to the John Kasich 2016 presidential campaign. Kasich would suspend his campaign shortly before he was defeated by Donald Trump in the California primaries. Due to these donations, he was criticized by Democrats as insufficiently loyal to the party or being a "Republican in disguise" during the campaign.

U.S. House of Representatives

Elections

2018 

His primary opponent, Hans Keirstead, was endorsed by the Democratic Party of California at the party convention. Rouda received the Democratic Congressional Campaign Committee endorsement in May 2018. In the nonpartisan blanket primary election, Rouda secured the second spot over Keirstead on the ballot by 125 votes (from a total of 174,024), thus allowing him to face Rohrabacher in the general election.

On October 25, Michael Bloomberg announced he would be supporting Rouda's campaign by donating $4 million to his PAC, Independence USA. That made Rouda's race against Rohrabacher the most expensive House race in the 2018 election cycle.

On November 6, the election was too close to call, as Rouda held a narrow lead over Rohrabacher. As mail-in votes were counted, Rouda's lead expanded, and the Associated Press called the race in his favor on November 10.

2020 

Rouda ran for reelection and faced off against the Republican challenger, Orange County supervisor Michelle Steel, during the general election on November 3, 2020. Steel ultimately defeated Rouda, garnering 51.1% of the vote to Rouda's 48.9%. Immediately after his loss, Rouda announced he would run against Steel again in 2022.

Rouda missed federally mandated deadlines for reporting that his wife traded stocks while he was in office. The missed reporting appeared to violate the STOCK Act, which is designed to combat insider trading.

2022 

After conceding the election, Rouda had announced that he would challenge Steel in 2022. However, new congressional maps going into effect for the 2022 cycle placed the homes of Rouda, Steel and two-term Democratic Representative Katie Porter in the same district, now numbered the 47th district. When Porter announced her intention to run in the 47th district, Steel chose to run in the new 45th district.

After initially announcing his intent to challenge Porter, Rouda dropped out of the race in January 2022. Rouda formed a political action committee, Join Together PAC, to support the election of moderate Democrats, such as Katrina Foley of the Orange County Board of Supervisors.

2024 

After incumbent representative Katie Porter announced that she would not be running reelection to the House in the 47th district, instead opting to run in the 2024 United States Senate election in California, Rouda announced that he would run for the seat in the 2024 elections.

Committee assignments 

 United States House Committee on Oversight and Reform
 Subcommittee on Environment (Chair)
 Subcommittee on National Security
 United States House Committee on Transportation and Infrastructure
 Subcommittee on Highways and Transit
 Subcommittee on Water Resources and Environment

Caucus memberships 

 Congressional Asian Pacific American Caucus
 New Democrat Coalition

Electoral history

Personal life 
Rouda and author Kaira Rouda (née Sturdivant) have been married since 1990. They have four children. They moved to California after Rouda sold the family firm.

References

External links

1961 births
American lawyers
American real estate brokers
American technology company founders
Businesspeople from Columbus, Ohio
California Republicans
Capital University Law School alumni
Living people
Members of the United States House of Representatives from California
Ohio State University Fisher College of Business alumni
Politicians from Columbus, Ohio
People from Columbus, Ohio
University of Kentucky alumni
Democratic Party members of the United States House of Representatives from California
Candidates in the 2024 United States House of Representatives elections